A plastic magnet is a non-metallic magnet made from an organic polymer.  One example is PANiCNQ, which is a combination of emeraldine-based polyaniline (PANi) and tetracyanoquinodimethane (TCNQ).  When it was created by Pakistan born scientist Naveed A. Zaidi and colleagues at the University of Durham in 2004, it was the first magnetic polymer to function at room temperature.

PANi is a conductive polymer that is stable in air. When combined with the free radical-forming TCNQ as an acceptor molecule, it can mimic the mechanism of metallic magnets. The magnetic properties arise from the fully pi-conjugated nitrogen-containing backbone combined with molecular charge transfer side groups. These properties cause the molecule to have a high density of localized spins that can give rise to coupling of their magnetic fields. When this polymer magnet is synthesized, the polymer chains need 3 months to line up before displaying any notable magnetism.

Plastic magnets could have uses in computer hardware, for example as disc drives and in medical devices such as pacemakers and cochlear implants  where the organic material is more likely to be biocompatible than its metallic counterpart.

In February 2002, researchers from Ohio State University & University of Utah developed the world's first light-tunable plastic magnet.
The plastic material became 1.5 times more magnetic when blue light shines on it. Green laser light reversed the effect somewhat, by decreasing the material's magnetism to 60 percent of its normal level. The plastic magnet was made from a polymer made of tetracyanoethylene (TCNE) combined with manganese (Mn) ions – atoms of the metal manganese with electrons removed.

Notes

External links

Types of magnets
Plastics applications